Breabag (815 m) is a mountain in the Northwest Highlands of Scotland, in the Assynt area of Sutherland.

A flat-topped summit, it is usually climbed from its western flank, where the Bone Caves of Assynt are located. The nearest settlement is Inchnadamph.

References

Mountains and hills of the Northwest Highlands
Marilyns of Scotland
Corbetts